The Colonial Social Science Research Council (CSSRC) was a British panel established in 1944 under the Colonial Development and Welfare Act 1940 to advise the Secretary of State for the Colonies on research funding in sociology and anthropology relating to colonial development. In 1949 it was chaired by Alexander Carr-Saunders and its members consisted of Frank Debenham, Raymond Firth, Harry Hodson, Margery Perham, Arnold Plant,  Margaret Helen Read, Godfrey Thomson, and Ralph Lilley Turner.

References

Further reading

Social sciences organizations
1944 establishments in the United Kingdom
Research councils
British Empire
History of social sciences